The Teackle Mansion is a historic estate at 11736 Mansion Street, Princess Anne, Maryland, United States. It was constructed between 1802 and 1819 for Littleton Dennis Teackle and his wife Elizabeth Upshur Teackle. It is notable for its Neoclassical architecture with many distinctive features, and its 19th century period rooms. It is the home of the Somerset County Historical Society, and was added to the National Register of Historic Places in 1971.

It is mentioned in the novel The Entailed Hat by George Alfred Townsend.

Footnotes

External links

, including photo in 1997, at Maryland Historical Trust website

1800s architecture in the United States
Historic house museums in Maryland
Houses on the National Register of Historic Places in Maryland
Museums in Somerset County, Maryland
Houses in Somerset County, Maryland
Houses completed in 1819
Historic American Buildings Survey in Maryland
Princess Anne, Maryland
National Register of Historic Places in Somerset County, Maryland